The Nanda dynasty ruled in the northern part of the Indian subcontinent during the fourth century BCE, and possibly during the fifth century BCE. The Nandas overthrew the Shaishunaga dynasty in the Magadha region of eastern India, and expanded their empire to include a larger part of northern India. Ancient sources differ considerably regarding the names of the Nanda kings and the duration of their rule, but based on the Buddhist tradition recorded in the Mahavamsa, they appear to have ruled during circa 345–322 BCE, although some theories date the start of their rule to fifth century BCE.

The Nandas built on the successes of their Haryanka and Shaishunaga predecessors, and instituted a more centralised administration. Ancient sources credit them with amassing great wealth, which was probably a result of introduction of new currency and taxation system. Ancient texts also suggest that the Nandas were unpopular among their subjects because of their low status birth, excessive taxation, and their general misconduct. The last Nanda king was overthrown by Chandragupta Maurya, the founder of the Maurya empire, and the latter's mentor Chanakya.

Modern historians generally identify the ruler of the Gangaridai and the Prasii mentioned in ancient Greco-Roman accounts as a Nanda king. While describing Alexander the Great's invasion of north-western India (327–325 BCE), the  Greco-Roman writers depict this kingdom as a great military power. The prospect of a war against this kingdom, coupled with the exhaustion resulting from almost a decade of campaigning, led to a mutiny among Alexander's homesick soldiers, putting an end to his Indian campaign.

Origins 

Both Indian and Greco-Roman traditions characterize the dynasty's founder as of low birth. According to Greek historian Diodorus (1st century BCE), Porus told Alexander that the contemporary Nanda king was thought to be the son of a barber. Roman historian Curtius (1st century CE) adds that according to Porus, this barber became the former queen's paramour thanks to his attractive looks, treacherously assassinated the then king, usurped the supreme authority by pretending to act as a guardian for the then princes, and later killed the princes.

The Jain tradition, as recorded in the Avashyaka Sutra and Parishishta-parvan, corroborates the Greco-Roman accounts, stating that the first Nanda king was the son of a barber.  According to the 12th century text Parishishta-parvan, the mother of the first Nanda king was a courtesan. However, the text also states that the daughter of the last Nanda king married Chandragupta, because it was customary for Kshatriya girls to choose their husbands; thus, it implies that the Nanda king claimed to be a Kshatriya, that is, a member of the warrior class.

The Puranas name the dynasty's founder as Mahapadma, and claim that he was the son of the Shaishunaga king Mahanandin. However, even these texts hint at the low birth of the Nandas, when they state that Mahapadma's mother belonged to the Shudra class, the lowest of the varnas. 

Since the claim of the barber ancestry of the dynasty's founder is attested by two different traditions—Greco-Roman and Jain, it appears to be more reliable than the Puranic claim of Shaishunaga ancestry.

The Buddhist tradition calls the Nandas "of unknown lineage" (annata-kula). According to Mahavamsa, the dynasty's founder was Ugrasena, who was originally "a man of the frontier": he fell into the hands of a gang of robbers, and later became their leader. He later ousted the sons of the Shaishunaga king Kalashoka (or Kakavarna).

K. N. Panikkar suggested that the Nandas were the sole Kshatriyas in India "at the time of the Mauryas" and M. N. Srinivas suggested that the "other Kshatriya castes have come into existence through a process of caste mobility from among the lower castes".

Regnal period 

There is little unanimity among the ancient sources regarding the total duration of the Nanda reign or their regnal period. For example, the Matsya Purana assigns 88 years to the rule of the first Nanda king alone, while some manuscripts of the Vayu Purana state the total duration of the Nanda rule as 40 years. The 16th century Buddhist scholar Taranatha assigns 29 years to the Nandas.

It is difficult to assign precise date for the Nanda and other early dynasties of Magadha. Historians Irfan Habib and Vivekanand Jha date the Nanda rule from c. 344–322 BCE, relying on the Sri Lankan Buddhist tradition which states that the Nandas ruled for 22 years. Historian Upinder Singh dates the Nanda rule from 364/345 BCE to 324 BCE, based on the assumption that Gautama Buddha died in c. 486 BCE.

According to another theory, based on astronomical calculations, the first Nanda king ascended the throne in 424 BCE. Proponents of this theory also interpret the Hathigumpha inscription to mean that "Nandaraja" (the Nanda king) flourished in year 103 of the Mahavira Era, that is, in 424 BCE.

The 14th century Jain writer Merutunga, in his Vichara-shreni, states that king Chandra Pradyota of Avanti died on the same night as the Jain leader Mahavira. He was succeeded by his son Palaka, who ruled for 60 years. After that, the Nandas rose to power at Pataliputra and captured the Avanti capital Ujjayini. The Nanda rule, spanning the reigns of nine kings, lasted for 155 years, after which the Mauryas came to power. According to the Shvetambara Jain tradition, Mahavira died in 527 BCE, which would mean that the Nanda rule—according to Merutunga's writings—lasted from 467 BCE to 312 BCE. According to historian R. C. Majumdar, while all the chronological details provided by Merutunga cannot be accepted without corroborative evidence, they cannot be dismissed as entirely unreliable unless contradicted by more reliable sources.

Nanda kings 

The Buddhist, Jain, and Puranic traditions all state that there were 9 Nanda kings, but the sources differ considerably on the names of these kings.

According to the Greco-Roman accounts, the Nanda rule spanned two generations. For example, the Roman historian Curtius (1st century CE) suggests that the dynasty's founder was a barber-turned-king, and that his son was the dynasty's last king, who was overthrown by Chandragupta. The Greek accounts name only one Nanda king—Agrammes or Xandrames—who was a contemporary of Alexander. "Agrammes" may be a Greek transcription of the Sanskrit word "Augrasainya" (literally "son or descendant of Ugrasena", Ugrasena being the name of the dynasty's founder according to the Buddhist tradition).

The Puranas, compiled in India in c. 4th century CE (but probably based on earlier sources), also state that the Nandas ruled for two generations. According to the Puranic tradition, the dynasty's founder was Mahapadma: the Matsya Purana assigns him an incredibly long reign of 88 years, while the Vayu Purana mentions the length of his reign as only 28 years. The Puranas further state that Mahapadma's 8 sons ruled in succession after him for a total of 12 years, but name only one of these sons: Sukalpa. A Vayu Purana script names him as "Sahalya", which apparently corresponds to the "Sahalin" mentioned in the Buddhist text Divyavadana. Dhundhi-raja, an 18th-century Puranic commentator, names one of the Nanda kings as Sarvatha-siddhi, and states that his son was Maurya, whose son was Chandragupta Maurya. However, the Puranas themselves do not talk of any relation between the Nanda and the Maurya dynasties.

According to the Sri Lankan Buddhist text Mahavamsa, written in Pali language, there were 9 Nanda kings – they were brothers who ruled in succession, for a total of 22 years. These nine kings were:

Imperial extent 

The Nanda capital was located at Pataliputra (near present-day Patna) in the Magadha region of eastern India. This is confirmed by the Buddhist and Jain traditions, as well as the Sanskrit play Mudrarakshasa. The Puranas also connect the Nandas to the Shaishunaga dynasty, which ruled in the Magadha region. The Greek accounts state that Agrammes (identified as a Nanda king) was the ruler of the Gangaridai (the Ganges valley) and the Prasii (probably a transcription of the Sanskrit word prachyas, literally "easterners"). According to the later writer Megasthenes (c. 300 BCE), Pataliputra (Greek: Palibothra) was located in the country of the Prasii, which further confirms that Pataliputra was the Nanda capital.

The Nanda empire appears to have stretched from present-day Punjab in the west to Odisha in the east. An analysis of various historical sources – including the ancient Greek accounts, the Puranas, and the Hathigumpha inscription – suggests that the Nandas controlled eastern India, the Ganges valley, and at least a part of Kalinga. It is also highly probable that they controlled the Avanti region in Central India, which made it possible for their successor Chandragupta Maurya to conquer present-day Gujarat western India. According to the Jain tradition, the Nanda minister subjugated the entire country up to the coastal areas.

The Puranas state that the Nanda king Mahapadma destroyed the Kshatriyas, and attained undisputed sovereignty. The Kshatriyas said to have been exterminated by him include Maithalas, Kasheyas, Ikshvakus, Panchalas, Shurasenas, Kurus, Haihayas, Vitihotras, Kalingas, and Ashmakas.

 The Maithala (literally, "of Mithilā") territory was located to the north of Magadha, on the border of present-day Nepal and northern Bihar. This region had come under the control of Magadha during the reign of the 5th century BCE king Ajatashatru. The Nandas probably subjugated the local chieftains, who may have retained some degree of independence from Magadha.
 The Kasheyas were the residents of the area around Kashi, that is, present-day Varanasi. According to the Puranas, a Shaishunaga prince was appointed to govern Kashi, which suggests that this region was under Shaishunaga control. The Nandas may have captured it from a successor of the Shaishunaga prince.
 The Ikshvakus ruled the historical Kosala region of present-day Uttar Pradesh, and had come into conflict with the Magadha kingdom during the reign of Ajatashatru. Their history after the reign of Virudhaka is obscure. A passage of the 11th century story-collection Kathasaritsagara refers to the Nanda camp (kataka) in the Ayodhya town of the Kosala region. This suggests that the Nanda king went on a military campaign to Kosala.
 The Panchalas occupied the Ganges valley to the north-west of the Kosala region, and there are no records of their conflict with the Magadha monarchs before the Nanda period. Therefore, it appears that the Nandas subjugated them. According to the Greek accounts, Alexander expected to face king Agrammes (identified as a Nanda king) if he advanced eastwards from the Punjab region. This suggests that the Nanda territory extended up to the Ganges river in the present-day western Uttar Pradesh.
 The Shurasenas ruled the area around Mathura. The Greek accounts suggest that they were subordinates to the king of the Prasii, that is, the Nanda king.
 The Kuru territory, which included the sacred site of Kurukshetra, was located to the west of the Panchala territory. The Greek records suggest that the king of Gangaridai and Prasii controlled this region, which may be taken as corrorobrative evidence for the Nanda conquest of the Kuru territory.
 The Haihayas ruled the Narmada valley in central India, with their capital at Mahishmati. The Nanda control over this territory does not seem improbable, given that their predecessors – the Shaishunagas – are said to have subjugated the rulers of Avanti in central India (according to the Puranas), and their successors – the Mauryas – are known to have ruled over Central India.
 The Vitihotras, according to the Puranas, were closely associated with the Haihayas. Their sovereignty is said to have ended before the rise of the Pradyota dynasty in Avanti, far earlier than the Nandas and the Shaishunagas came to power. However, a passage in the Bhavishyanukirtana of the Puranas suggests that the Vitihotras were contemporaries of the Shaishunagas. It is possible that the Shaishunagas restored a Pradyota prince as a subordinate ruler, after defeating the Pradyotas. The Nandas may have defeated this Vitihotra ruler. The Jain writers describe the Nandas as the successors of Palaka, the son of king Pradyota.
 The Kalingas occupied the coastal territory in present-day Odisha and Andhra Pradesh. The Nanda control of this region is corroborated by the Hathigumpha inscription of the later king Kharavela (c. 1st or 2nd century BCE). The inscription states that "Nanda-raja" (the Nanda king) had excavated a canal in Kalinga, and had taken a Jain idol from Kalinga. According to the inscription, this canal had been dug "ti-vasa-sata" years ago: the term is variously interpreted as "three hundred" or "one hundred and three".
 The Ashmakas occupied the Godavari valley in the Deccan region. According to one theory, Nanded in this region was originally called "Nau Nand Dehra" (abode of the nine Nandas), which may be considered as evidence of the Nanda control of this area. However, there is no concrete evidence that the Nanda rule extended to the south of the Vindhya range.

The Amaravathi hoard of Punch marked coins have revealed imperial standard coins dating back to the Nandas besides other dynasties of Magadha, including the Mauryas; but it is not certain when this region was annexed by the Magadhan rulers.

Some Kuntala country (North Mysore) inscriptions suggest that the Nandas also ruled it, which included a part of present-day Karnataka in southern India. However, these inscriptions are relatively late (c. 1200 CE), and therefore, cannot be considered as reliable in this context. The Magadha empire included parts of southern India during the reign of the Mauryas – the successors of the Nandas – but there is no satisfactory account of how they came to control this area. For example, an inscription discovered at Bandanikke states:

Military strength 

Alexander the Great invaded north-western India at the time of Agrammes or Xandrames, whom modern historians generally identify as the last Nanda king – Dhana Nanda. In the summer of 326 BCE, Alexander's army reached the Beas River (Greek: Hyphasis), beyond which the Nanda territory was located.

According to Curtius, Alexander learned that Agrammes had 200,000 infantry; 20,000 cavalry; 3000 elephants; and 2,000 four-horse chariots. Diodorus gives the number of elephants as 4,000. Plutarch inflates these numbers significantly, except the infantry: according to him, the Nanda force included 200,000 infantry; 80,000 cavalry; 6,000 elephants; and 8,000 chariots. It is possible that the numbers reported to Alexander had been exaggerated by the local Indian population, who had the incentive to mislead the invaders.

The Nanda army did not have the opportunity to face Alexander, whose soldiers mutinied at the Beas River, refusing to go any further in the east. Alexander's soldiers had first started to agitate to return to their homeland at Hecatompylos in 330 BCE, and the stiff resistance that they had met in north-western India in the subsequent years had demoralised them. They mutinied, when faced with the prospect of facing the Nanda army, forcing Alexander to withdraw from India.

Administration 

Little information survives on the Nanda administration today. The Puranas describe the Nanda king as ekarat ("single ruler"), which suggests that the Nanda empire was an integrated monarchy rather than a group of virtually independent feudal states. However, the Greek accounts suggest the presence of a more federated system of governance. For example, Arrian mentions that the land beyond the Beas River was governed by "the aristocracy, who exercised their authority with justice and moderation." The Greek accounts mention the Gangaridai and the Prasii separately, although suggesting that these two were ruled by a common sovereign. Historian H. C. Raychaudhuri theorises that the Nandas held centralised control over their core territories in present-day Bihar and Uttar Pradesh, but allowed considerable autonomy in the frontier parts of their empire. This is suggested by Buddhist legends, which state Chandragupta was unable to defeat the Nandas when he attacked their capital but was successful against them when he gradually conquered the frontier regions of their empire.

The Nanda kings appear to have strengthened the Magadha kingdom ruled by their Haryanka and Shaishunaga predecessors, creating the first great empire of northern India in the process. Historians have put forward various theories to explain the political success of these dynasties of Magadha. Pataliputra, the capital of Magadha, was naturally protected because of its location at the junction of the Ganges and the Son rivers. The Ganges and its tributaries connected the kingdom with important trade routes. It had fertile soil and access to lumber and elephants of the adjacent areas. Some historians have suggested that Magadha was relatively free from the Brahmanical orthodoxy, which may have played a role in its political success; however, it is difficult to assess the veracity of this claim. D. D. Kosambi theorised that Magadha's monopoly over iron ore mines played a major role in its imperial expansion, but historian Upinder Singh has disputed this theory, pointing out that Magadha did not have a monopoly over these mines, and the iron mining in the historical Magadha region started much later. Singh, however, notes that the adjoining Chota Nagpur Plateau was rich in many minerals and other raw materials, and access to these would have been an asset for Magadha.

Ministers and scholars 

According to the Jain tradition, Kalpaka was the minister of the first Nanda king. He became a minister reluctantly, but after assuming the office, he encouraged the king to adopt an aggressive expansionist policy. The Jain texts suggest that the ministerial offices of the Nanda Empire were hereditary. For example, after the death of Shakatala, a minister of the last Nanda king, his position was offered to his son Sthulabhadra; when Sthulabhadra refused the offer, Shakatala's second son Shriyaka was appointed as the minister.

The Brihatkatha tradition claims that under the Nanda rule, the city of Pataliputra not only became the abode of the goddess of material prosperity (Lakshmi), but also of the goddess of learning (Sarasvati). According to this tradition, notable grammarians such as Varsha, Upavarsha, Panini, Katyayana, Vararuchi, and Vyadi lived during the Nanda period. While much of this account is unreliable folklore, it is probable that some of the grammarians who preceded Patanjali lived during the Nanda period.

Wealth 

Several historical sources refer to the great wealth of the Nandas. According to the Mahavamsa, the last Nanda king was a treasure-hoarder, and amassed wealth worth 80 kotis (800 million). He buried these treasures in the bed of the Ganges river. He acquired further wealth by levying taxes on all sorts of objects, including skins, gums, trees, and stones.

A verse by the Tamil poet Mamulanar refers to "the untold wealth of the Nandas", which was "swept away and submerged later on by the floods of the Ganges". Another interpretation of this verse states this wealth was hidden in the waters of the Ganges. The 7th-century Chinese traveller Xuanzang mentions the "five treasures of king Nanda's seven precious substances".

Greek writer Xenophon, in his Cyropaedia (4th century BCE), mentions that the king of India was very wealthy, and aspired to arbitrate in the disputes between the kingdoms of West Asia. Although Xenophon's book describes the events of the 6th century BCE (the period of Cyrus the Great), historian H. C. Raychaudhuri speculates that the writer's image of the Indian king may be based on the contemporary Nanda king.

The Kashika, a commentary on Panini's grammar, mentions Nandopakramani manani – a measuring standard introduced by the Nandas. This may be a reference to their introduction of a new currency system and punch-marked coins, which may have been responsible for much of their wealth. A hoard of coins found at the site of ancient Pataliputra probably belongs to the Nanda period.

Religion 

The Nanda Empire's population included adherents of Hinduism, Buddhism and Jainism. The Nandas and the Mauryas appear to have patronised the religions originating in the Greater Magadha region, namely Jainism, Ajivikism, and Buddhism. However, the rulers of the empire never engaged in conversion of their subjects to other religions and there is no evidence that these rulers discriminated against any contemporary religion.

In the pre-Nanda period, the Vedic Brahmanism was supported by several smaller kings, who patronised the Brahmin priests. The declining power of these kings under the more centralised Nanda and Maurya rule appears to have deprived the Brahmins of their patrons, resulting in the gradual decline of the traditional Vedic society.

The Jain tradition suggests that several Nanda ministers were inclined towards Jainism. When Shakatala, a minister of the last Nanda king, died, his son Sthulabhadra refused to inherit his father's office, and instead became a Jain monk. Sthulabhadra's brother Shriyaka accepted the post.

Architecture 

Pataliputra Voussoir Arch

A granite stone fragment of an arch discovered by K. P. Jayaswal from Kumhrar, Pataliputra has been analysed as a pre Maurya-Nanda period keystone fragment of a trefoil arch of gateway with mason's marks of three archaic Brahmi letters inscribed on it which probably decorated a Torana. The wedge-shaped stone with indentation has Mauryan polish on two sides and was suspended vertically.

Nanda era 
According to K. P Jayaswal, Nanda era is mentioned in three sources. Kharavela's Hathigumpha inscription mentions Nandaraja constructing canal 103 year in Nanda period. According to Al beruni The Sriharsha era was being used in areas of Kannauj and Mathura and there was a difference of 400 years between sriharsha era and Vikrama era which would make it 458 BC, the attributes of which matched with the Nanda kings. According to 12th century Yedarava inscription of Chalukya king Vikramaditya VI, Nanda era along with vikram era and Shaka era were extent which were abolished in favour of a new Chalukyan era, but other scholars have opined that evidences are too meager to make anything conclusive.

Unpopularity and overthrow 

All historical accounts agree that the last Nanda king was unpopular among his subjects. According to Diodorus, Porus told Alexander that the contemporary Nanda king was a man of "worthless character", and was not respected by his subjects as he was thought to be of low origin. Curtius also states that according to Porus, the Nanda king was despised by his subjects. According to Plutarch, who claims that Androkottos (identified as Chandragupta) met Alexander, Androkottos later declared that Alexander could have easily conquered the Nanda territory (Gangaridai and Prasii) because the Nanda king was hated and despised by his subjects, as he was wicked and of low origin. The Sri Lankan Buddhist tradition blames the Nandas for being greedy and for imposing oppressive taxation. The Puranas of India label the Nandas as adharmika, indicating that they did not follow the norms of dharma or righteous conduct.

The Nanda dynasty was overthrown by Chandragupta Maurya, who was supported by his mentor (and later minister) Chanakya. Some accounts mention Chandragupta as a member of the Nanda family. For example, the 11th century writers Kshemendra and Somadeva describe Chandragupta as a "son of the genuine Nanda" (purva-Nanda-suta). Dhundiraja, in his commentary on the Vishnu Purana, names Chandragupta's father as Maurya; he describes Maurya as a son of the Nanda king Sarvatha-siddhi and a hunter's daughter named Mura.

The Buddhist text Milinda Panha mentions a war between the Nanda general Bhaddasala (Sanskrit: Bhadrashala) and Chandragupta. According to the text, this war led to the slaughter of 10,000 elephants; 100,000 horses; 5,000 charioteers; and a billion foot soldiers. While this is obviously an exaggeration, it suggests that the overthrow of the Nanda dynasty was a violent affair.

References

Bibliography 

 
 
 
 
 
 
 
 
 

 
Magadha
Kingdoms of Bihar
Dynasties of Bengal
4th-century BC establishments in India
4th-century BC disestablishments in India
History of Uttar Pradesh
4th-century BC establishments in Nepal
4th-century BC disestablishments in Nepal
Former empires